Jefferson Elementary School is an elementary school in Winona, Minnesota, United States.  Its building was completed in 1938, the last of five new facilities built by Winona Public Schools in the early 20th century.  It was listed on the National Register of Historic Places in 2012 for its local significance in the themes of architecture and education.  It was nominated for representing the efforts of Winona Public Schools to implement progressive educational reforms, as well as for its Public Works Administration funding and Art Moderne architecture.

See also
 National Register of Historic Places listings in Winona County, Minnesota

References

External links
 Jefferson STEM Elementary

1938 establishments in Minnesota
Buildings and structures in Winona, Minnesota
Moderne architecture in Minnesota
National Register of Historic Places in Winona County, Minnesota
Public elementary schools in Minnesota
Public Works Administration in Minnesota
PWA Moderne architecture
School buildings completed in 1938
School buildings on the National Register of Historic Places in Minnesota
Schools in Winona County, Minnesota